The following is a standard order of battle of the Polish cavalry brigade in 1939.

Chain of command

Composition and armament

The following is a list of all equipment, armament, men and means of transport in use by a cavalry regiment and a cavalry brigade of the Polish Army, as of 1939. The figures for brigades are based on official Polish Army instructions prepared in late 1930s. The numbers in brackets give the figures for a four-regiment brigade, as opposed to the standard three-regiment one. The figures for the regiments are given after the actual mobilisation report of September 1, 1939, of the 25th Greater Polish Uhlans Regiment. Note that the numbers for other units may vary, mostly due to different mobilisation schedules and other problems.

Polish cavalry brigades in 1939

Cavalry 
 Kraków Cavalry Brigade (Kraków) - under Brigadier General Zygmunt Piasecki
 Kresowa Cavalry Brigade (Brody) - under Colonel Stefan Hanka-Kulesza
 Mazowiecka Cavalry Brigade (Warsaw) under Colonel Jan Karcz
 Nowogródzka Cavalry Brigade (Baranowicze) under Brigadier General Władysław Anders
 Podlaska Cavalry Brigade (Białystok) under Brigadier General Ludwik Kmicic-Skrzyński
 Podolska Cavalry Brigade (Stanisławów) under Colonel Leon Strzelecki
 Pomeranian Cavalry Brigade (Bydgoszcz) under Colonel Adam Zakrzewski
 Suwalska Cavalry Brigade (Suwałki) under Brigadier General Zygmunt Podhorski
 Wielkopolska Cavalry Brigade (Poznań) under Brigadier General Roman Abraham
 Wileńska Cavalry Brigade (Wilno) under Colonel Konstanty Drucki-Lubecki
 Wołyńska Cavalry Brigade (Równe) under Colonel Julian Filipowicz

Armoured-Motorised Brigades 
Different armament and structure
10th Motorized Cavalry Brigade (Poland) (Rzeszów) - dowódca: płk dypl. Stanisław Maczek
Warszawska Brygada Pancerno-Motorowa (Warsaw) - dowódca: płk dypl. Stefan Rowecki

See also 
 Polish cavalry
 Polish army
 Polish Defensive War of 1939

World War II orders of battle
Tables of Organisation and Equipment
Polish cavalry
Invasion of Poland